Mahmood Ebrahimzadeh (born December 22, 1957) is a retired Iranian footballer and now football coach. In 1980, during the Iran–Iraq War, he left Iran and went to Germany. He is now an American citizen.

Playing career
Ebrahimzadeh is one of the most famous footballers to come from Bushehr, he started his football career with Shahin Bushehr. He then played for Iranian club FC Aboomoslem during 1975/76 season where he scored 11 goals, and was captain of Zobahan F.C. in 1976/77 season.

In the 1980s, he played in Germany for four years most notably for VfL Wolfsburg.

He made his debut for Iran national football team on November 18, 1977 against Hong Kong as a substitute, during a 1978 FIFA World Cup qualification.

Managerial career
He coached for A.C. Milan, Ajax F.C. and Santos F.C. football academies.

References

Iranian footballers
Iran international footballers
Association football midfielders
Iranian expatriate footballers
Expatriate footballers in Germany
Iranian football managers
People from Bushehr
1953 births
Zob Ahan Esfahan F.C. players
F.C. Aboomoslem players
VfL Wolfsburg players
Living people